FC Sokil Berezhany (formerly FC Lysonya) is a Ukrainian amateur football club based in Berezhany, Ternopil Oblast.

History
The club was founded in 1982 and plays in the football championship of Ternopil Oblast. The team were the champions of Ternopil Oblast in 2000 and 2001, while they finished second in 2009.

In 1992, the club played in the Ukrainian Transfer League under the name "Lysonya" (named so after the mountain near Berezhany), but after two seasons the club was renamed to Sokil (Ukrainian for "Falcon") and returned to amateur football.

In 1998, the team won the Cup of Ternopil Oblast. Sokil played two matches in Ukrainian Second League of 2005–06 season, but withdrew.

Honours
 Ternopil Oblast Football Championship
 Winners (3): 2000, 2001, 2012

League and cup history

{|class="wikitable"
|-bgcolor="#efefef"
! Season
! Div.
! Pos.
! Pl.
! W
! D
! L
! GS
! GA
! P
!Domestic Cup
!colspan=2|Europe
!Notes
|-
|align=center|1992
|align=center|3
|align=center|8
|align=center|16
|align=center|2
|align=center|6
|align=center|8
|align=center|14
|align=center|21
|align=center|10
|align=center|
|align=center|
|align=center|
|align=center bgcolor=red|Relegated
|-
|align=center|1992–93
|align=center|3B
|align=center|16
|align=center|34
|align=center|7
|align=center|9
|align=center|18
|align=center|20
|align=center|53
|align=center|23
|align=center|
|align=center|
|align=center|
|align=center bgcolor=red|Relegated
|-
|align=center|1993–94
|align=center|4
|align=center|10
|align=center|22
|align=center|5
|align=center|6
|align=center|11
|align=center|12
|align=center|29
|align=center|16
|align=center|
|align=center|
|align=center|
|align=center|
|-
|align=center rowspan=2|2001
|align=center rowspan=2|4
|align=center|2
|align=center|6
|align=center|2
|align=center|2
|align=center|2
|align=center|6
|align=center|6
|align=center|8
|align=center rowspan=2|
|align=center rowspan=2|
|align=center rowspan=2|
|align=center|to Second Stage
|-
|align=center|6
|align=center|10
|align=center|0
|align=center|2
|align=center|8
|align=center|2
|align=center|10
|align=center|2
|align=center|eliminated
|-
|align=center|2002
|align=center|4
|align=center|4
|align=center|8
|align=center|3
|align=center|1
|align=center|4
|align=center|11
|align=center|8
|align=center|10
|align=center|
|align=center|
|align=center|
|align=center|eliminated
|-
|align=center|2004
|align=center|4
|align=center|2
|align=center|8
|align=center|4
|align=center|2
|align=center|2
|align=center|14
|align=center|8
|align=center|14
|align=center|
|align=center|
|align=center|
|align=center|refused next stage
|-
|align=center|2005
|align=center|4
|align=center|4
|align=center|10
|align=center|4
|align=center|2
|align=center|4
|align=center|10
|align=center|7
|align=center|14
|align=center|
|align=center|
|align=center|
|align=center|applied for Second League
|-
|align=center|2005–06
|align=center|3
|align=center|X
|align=center|2
|align=center|0
|align=center|1
|align=center|1
|align=center|1
|align=center|8
|align=center|1
|align=center|Q1 round
|align=center|
|align=center|
|align=center bgcolor=red|withdrew, results annulled
|-
|align=center|2008
|align=center|4
|align=center|5
|align=center|8
|align=center|1
|align=center|1
|align=center|6
|align=center|7
|align=center|8
|align=center|4
|align=center|
|align=center|
|align=center|
|align=center bgcolor=red|withdrew
|}

See also
 FC Nyva Ternopil, formerly as Nyva Berezhany

 
Amateur football clubs in Ukraine
Football clubs in Berezhany
Association football clubs established in 1982
1982 establishments in Ukraine
Agrarian association football clubs in Ukraine